Bobsleigh at the 2016 Winter Youth Olympics was held at the Lillehammer Olympic Bobsleigh and Luge Track in Lillehammer, Norway on 20 February. The competition had a Men's and a Women's monobob event.

Medal summary

Medal table

Events

Qualification system
Each nation could send a maximum of 6 athletes (3 boys and 3 girls). The FIBT ranking were used to allocate places to NOC's. Participation, for each of the men's and women's competitions, was limited to a total of 15 athletes each, including the host nation. The NOC quotas were based on the updated FIBT ranking. Qualification was achieved by the results of athletes, who gained a qualification place for their NOC. Male and female athletes of non represented continents also participated, with 1 male and 1 female athlete, provided that the maximum quota of 15 men and 15 women was not yet filled. Athletes must also meet eligibility criteria, which is explained in detail in the qualification system.

Quota allocation
Quota allocation according to the world rankings.

Qualification summary

References

External links
Results Book – Bobsleigh

 
Youth Olympic
2016 Winter Youth Olympics events
2016
Youth Olympic